Grzegorzów may refer to the following places in Poland:
Grzegorzów in Gmina Mściwojów, Jawor County in Lower Silesian Voivodeship (SW Poland)
Grzegorzów in Gmina Kondratowice, Strzelin County in Lower Silesian Voivodeship (SW Poland)